The Philippine School is a school in Dubai catering for Filipinos, covering grade levels from kindergarten through the 12th grade.

The school's 2019-2020 inspection report by the Dubai School Inspection Bureau of the Knowledge and Human Development Authority was summarized as "acceptable".

References

External links
Official website
Knowledge & Human Development Authority (Government of Dubai)
 Paper by a teacher at The Philippine School, Dubai that deals in part with students at the school

Philippine international schools in Asia
International schools in Dubai